The European Vegetarian Union (EVU) is a non-profit, non-governmental umbrella organisation for vegetarian societies and groups in Europe. The union works in the areas of vegetarianism, nutrition, health, consumer protection, the campaign for animal rights, ecology, general information and against world hunger. Headquarters are in Winterthur (Switzerland), together with the Swiss organisation Swissveg.

History 
 The EVU distributed the 1995 film Devour the Earth about the global consequences of meat consumption. The film was produced by the Vegetarian Society, written by Tony Wardle and narrated by Paul McCartney.
 In October 2011, Renato Pichler, President of the EVU, reported that the French government's Décret 2011-1227 and associated  (September 30, 2011) effectively outlaws the serving of vegan meals at any public or private school in France. Similar decrees are proposed for kindergartens, hospitals, prisons and retirement homes.

Purpose 
The main activities of the EVU are:

 To support and represent member societies on a European level, and to offer a platform for close cooperation; 
 To raise public awareness of, and promote vegetarianism, vegetarian issues and the benefits of a vegetarian lifestyle;
 To lobby governments, European institutions and organisations for greater recognition of vegetarian issues in policy decisions; and 
 To further promote the V-Label scheme (Universal Vegetarian Symbol), in the interest of all vegetarian and vegan consumers across Europe and the rest of the world. The V-Label is a standardised European vegetarian label from the EVU with the aim of easy identification of vegetarian products and services.

Labeling issues 
As the demand for vegan and vegetarian products in Europe has continued to rise, the European Vegetarian Union has tried to define how to label "vegetarian" and "vegan" items.  They have argued that the vegan label on a product should have a clear and standard meaning. They have put forth two main requirements:

 "The deliberate use of non-vegan or non-vegetarian substances must be ruled out."
 "The (potential) presence of inadvertent traces of non-vegan or non-vegetarian substances should not be an obstacle to labelling a product as vegan or vegetarian, provided that such contamination occurs despite a careful production process that complies with the best practices and the state of the art."

Despite the organization's efforts, the European Commission initially refused to enact any changes. The EVU has continued to lobby state governments, especially in Germany because the country experienced more widespread support for the labeling legislation. As a result, "consumer protection ministers of German Länder unanimously agreed on a proposal for a wording of the definition of the terms "vegan" and "vegetarian" for food labelling and put it into effect for the food control authorities within their jurisdictions, making it de facto binding." A recent 2018 report predicts that "vegan" and "vegetarian" labels will be required to meet the EVU's criteria by the year 2020.

See also 
 List of vegetarian organizations
 The Vegan Society (United Kingdom)
 Vegetarian Society (United Kingdom)
 Vegetarian and vegan symbolism

Animal protection movements 
 Human Environment Animal Protection (Tierschutzpartei)
 Vegetarians' International Voice for Animals

References

External links 
 

Food politics
Vegetarian publications and websites
Vegetarian organizations
Winterthur
Certification marks
Ecolabelling
Vegetarianism in Switzerland